Linklater is a locality in southwestern Manitoba, Canada. It is located approximately 7 kilometers (4 miles) west of Reston, Manitoba in the Rural Municipality of Pipestone.

References 

Localities in Manitoba
Unincorporated communities in Westman Region